The 2023 India Open (officially known as the Yonex-Sunrise India Open 2023 for sponsorship reasons) was a badminton tournament that took place at the K. D. Jadhav Indoor Hall in New Delhi, India, from 17 to 22 January 2023. It had a total prize pool of US$750,000. This was the first India Open to have a Super 750 status.

Tournament
The 2023 India Open was the second tournament of the 2023 BWF World Tour and was also part of the India Open championships, which had been held since 2008. The tournament was organized by the Badminton Association of India with sanction from the Badminton World Federation.

Venue
This international tournament was held at the K. D. Jadhav Indoor Hall in New Delhi, India.

Point distribution
Below is the point distribution table for each phase of the tournament based on the BWF points system for the BWF World Tour Super 750 event.

Prize money
The total prize money for this tournament was US$850,000 with the distribution of the prize money in accordance by BWF regulations.

Men's singles

Seeds

 Viktor Axelsen (final)
 Lee Zii Jia (second round)
 Loh Kean Yew (quarter-finals)
 Jonatan Christie (semi-finals)
 Chou Tien-chen (quarter-finals)
 Anthony Sinisuka Ginting (semi-finals)
 Lakshya Sen (second round)
 Kunlavut Vitidsarn (champion)

Finals

Top half

Section 1

Section 2

Bottom half

Section 3

Section 4

Women's singles

Seeds

 Akane Yamaguchi (final) 
 An Se-young (champion) 
 Chen Yufei (quarter-finals)
 He Bingjiao (semi-finals)
 P. V. Sindhu (first round)
 Ratchanok Intanon (second round)
 Wang Zhiyi (second round)
 Pornpawee Chochuwong (quarter-finals)

Finals

Top half

Section 1

Section 2

Bottom half

Section 3

Section 4

Men's doubles

Seeds

 Takuro Hoki / Yugo Kobayashi (first round)
 Fajar Alfian / Muhammad Rian Ardianto (semi-finals)
 Aaron Chia / Soh Wooi Yik (final)
 Mohammad Ahsan / Hendra Setiawan (first round)
 Satwiksairaj Rankireddy / Chirag Shetty (second round)
 Kim Astrup / Anders Skaarup Rasmussen (second round)
 Ong Yew Sin / Teo Ee Yi (quarter-finals)
 Marcus Fernaldi Gideon / Kevin Sanjaya Sukamuljo (quarter-finals)

Finals

Top half

Section 1

Section 2

Bottom half

Section 3

Section 4

Women's doubles

Seeds

 Chen Qingchen / Jia Yifan (final)
 Nami Matsuyama / Chiharu Shida (champions)
 Kim So-yeong / Kong Hee-yong (second round)
 Jeong Na-eun / Kim Hye-jeong (semi-finals)
 Jongkolphan Kititharakul / Rawinda Prajongjai (second round)
 Zhang Shuxian / Zheng Yu (quarter-finals)
 Lee So-hee / Shin Seung-chan (second round)
 Pearly Tan / Thinaah Muralitharan (semi-finals)

Finals

Top half

Section 1

Section 2

Bottom half

Section 3

Section 4

Mixed doubles

Seeds

 Zheng Siwei / Huang Yaqiong (semi-finals)
 Dechapol Puavaranukroh / Sapsiree Taerattanachai (second round)
 Yuta Watanabe / Arisa Higashino (champions)
 Wang Yilyu / Huang Dongping (final)
 Seo Seung-jae / Chae Yoo-jung (quarter-finals)
 Tan Kian Meng / Lai Pei Jing (first round)
 Tang Chun Man / Tse Ying Suet (second round)
 Thom Gicquel / Delphine Delrue (quarter-finals)

Finals

Top half

Section 1

Section 2

Bottom half

Section 3

Section 4

Controversies

Food hygiene issues
Due to unhygienic food provided by the athletes' hotel, Chinese badminton players Chen Yufei and Wang Zhiyi got gastroenteritis and were forced to pull out from the tournament. Later on, Chinese women's doubles finalist Chen Qingchen and Jia Yifan and mixed doubles finalist Wang Yilyu and Huang Dongping both withdrew from the finals and must hand the titles to Japanese pairs due to similar issues.

References

External link
 Tournament Link

India Open (badminton)
India Open
India Open
India Open